Generating may refer to:

 Generation of electricity as from an electrical generator
 A Cantonese food classification

See also
Generation (disambiguation)